"More Than Words Can Say" (also known as "(I Need You Now) More Than Words Can Say" for promotional purposes) is a song by Canadian rock band Alias. It was released in September 1990 as the second single from their debut eponymous album. The power ballad became a  2 hit in the United States and reached No. 1 in Canada for four weeks.

BMI presented Alias lead vocalist and songwriter Freddy Curci with the "Million-airs award" for "More Than Words Can Say". According to BMI's web site, only 1,500 songs have achieved Million-air status (one million air plays) among the 4.5 million songs by 300,000 BMI represented artists. One million performances is the equivalent of approximately 50,000 broadcast hours, or more than 5.7 years of continuous airplay.

Composition and inspiration
"More Than Words Can Say" was written, arranged, and co-produced by former Sheriff vocalist Freddy Curci and guitarist Steve DeMarchi. DeMarchi's younger brother Denny played the keyboard and sang the backing vocals. Curci recorded the vocals in Denny DeMarchi's bedroom at DeMarchi's family home.

At the time, their dissolved band had hit number one with "When I'm with You" the previous year, and the other band members had refused to reunite. Sensing the need to follow up the hit, Curci and DeMarchi joined ex-Heart members guitarist Roger Fisher, bassist Steve Fossen, and drummer Mike Derosier to form Alias. This tune, bearing striking similarities to "When I'm With You" (including a sustained last note), was the result.

Chart performance
"More Than Words Can Say" was released as the second single of Alias' self-titled debut album. It entered the Billboard Hot 100 at No. 84 and reached the top 40 four weeks later. On November 24, 1990, it peaked at No. 2. It also peaked at No. 2 on the Adult Contemporary chart and at No. 13 on the Album Rock Tracks chart. In the band's native Canada, the song reached No. 1 on November 24 and stayed there for four weeks, ending 1990 as the country's second highest-selling single, behind another power ballad, Phil Collins' "I Wish It Would Rain Down". It also topped Canada's Adult Contemporary chart for a week. Outside North America, "More Than Words Can Say" only managed to chart in Australia and New Zealand, peaking at No. 30 and No. 37 respectively.

Charts

Weekly charts

Year-end charts

References

 Feldman, Christopher (2000). The Billboard Book of Number Two Hits. . 
 "Billboard". Billboard Hot 100 airplay and sales charts. Retrieved 2006-06-11.

External links
 Official Alias Myspace
 Freddy Curci (lead singer) website

1990 songs
1990 singles
Alias (band) songs
EMI Records singles
Glam metal ballads
RPM Top Singles number-one singles